Merienda is a light meal in southern Europe, particularly Spain (merenda in Galician, berenar in Catalan), Portugal (lanche or merenda) and Italy (merenda), as well as Hispanic America, The Philippines (meryenda/merienda), North Africa (Morocco), and Brazil (lanche or merenda). Usually taken in the afternoon or for brunch, it fills in the meal gap between the noontime meal and the evening meal, being the equivalent of afternoon tea in the English-speaking world; or between breakfast and lunch.  It is a simple meal that often consists of a piece of fruit, bread, cookies, yogurt, and other snacks paired with juice, milk, hot chocolate, coffee, spirits, or other beverages.

It is typical for Argentines, Paraguayans, and Uruguayans to have merienda around 5pm, between the midday meal and supper. It generally consists of an infusion (tea, mate, coffee, mate cocido, etc.) and a baked snack (scones, bread, toasts, cake, facturas, etc.), usually accompanied with dulce de leche, honey, butter or jam.

In the Philippines, merienda (Filipino: meryenda) is a generic term encompassing two light meals: the first is a morning snack that may correspond to either brunch, elevenses, or second breakfast; the second one is the equivalent of afternoon tea. Merienda taken in the early evening around sunset just before or in place of dinner is meanwhile distinctly referred to as merienda cena. Broadly, merienda is any sort of dish or snack in a portion smaller than the traditional "full meal" consisting of rice and a complementary viand (unless the merienda is taken as brunch or merienda cena), coupled with either a cool or hot drink (usually coffee). Common fare may be sweet or savoury, ranging from breads and pastries (notably pandesal), desserts and sweets, street food, to noodle dishes.

In coastal parts of Croatia, Slovenia, and on the Greek island of Corfu, it is referred to marenda, a meal eaten between breakfast and lunch.  Usually it is a light snack, like sandwiches or toast, eaten during a work break.

Goûter
In France, the merienda is called goûter or quatre-heures; the latter name refers to its timing at around 4PM. The modern goûter is lighter than a full meal, and is more often observed by children than by adults. It was a full cold meal until the 18th century, before which the goûter was taken at around 5PM, but began to fade in popularity thereafter, since the evening meal was pushed up to around 6PM.

See also
 Pan dulce
Snack
Snacking

References

Argentine cuisine
Brazilian cuisine
Latin American cuisine
Philippine cuisine
Moroccan cuisine
French cuisine
Spanish cuisine
Portuguese cuisine
Andorran cuisine
Italian cuisine
Greek cuisine
Croatian cuisine
Serbian cuisine
Slovenian cuisine
Polish cuisine
Meals